Michelle Cowan (born 1982) is an Australian rules football coach who was the inaugural head coach of the Fremantle Football Club in the AFL Women's competition (AFLW).

Early life
Cowan lived in Durban, South Africa, before moving to Kambalda, Western Australia at the age of four.

Coaching career
After completing high school, Cowan contacted all sixteen AFL clubs to seek a coaching position. After no interest from fifteen of the clubs,  agreed to meet with her and appointed her as a Western Australian based talent scout at just seventeen years of age. At 21 years of age, Cowan became the first female assistant coach in the West Australian Football League (WAFL) when she became the midfield coach with the West Perth Football Club. She spent eight years with West Perth before moving to the South Fremantle Football Club, also as the midfield coach.

In 2013, she was appointed the senior coach of the Melbourne Football Club's women's team during the women's exhibition series and in the same year she was named as the Football Woman of the Year. She coached Melbourne for all three years of the exhibition series - winning 5 out of the 6 matches and in February 2016, she became the first female assistant coach in Melbourne's history and the second in AFL history when she became the player development and welfare coach. Due to family reasons she left the club in July and became the inaugural coach of the Fremantle AFL Women's team.

After entering the inaugural AFL Women's season as favourites to win the premiership, Fremantle failed to live up to the pre-season expectation with the AFL head of female football and junior development, Josh Vanderloo, stating the reason was most likely due to injuries to key players and losing elite Western Australian talent to other states as marquee signings. Cowan finished the season with one win, five losses and a draw.

Fremantle finished the 2018 season with three wins, finishing seventh. Cowan was in discussions to extend her contract for the 2019 season, but instead chose to resign as head coach.

Cowan was approached by West Coast Eagles after leaving Fremantle, who offered her a contract for the 2020 AFLW season. She is also currently the AFL’s High Performance Coach / Mentor for the Female Coach Academy.

Coaching statistics
Statistics are correct to the end of the 2018 season

Melbourne Exhibition Games 5 Wins 1 Loss 
|- style="background-color: #EAEAEA"
! scope="row" style="font-weight:normal"|2017
|
| 7 || 1 || 5 || 1 || 14.3% || 7 || 8
|-
! scope="row" style="font-weight:normal"|2018
|
| 7 || 3 || 4 || 0 || 42.9% || 7 || 8
|- class="sortbottom"
! colspan=2| Career totals
! 14
! 4
! 9
! 1
! 28.6%
! colspan=2|
|}

References

External links

Michelle Cowan's profile from AustralianFootball.com

Living people
1983 births
AFL Women's coaches
Fremantle Football Club coaches
South African emigrants to Australia